Out in the Sun is the second album by former Yes keyboard player Patrick Moraz, released in August 1977.

Track listing 
All tracks written by Patrick Moraz; co-writing credits are noticed.
"Out in the Sun" (McBurnie) – 4:27
"Rana Batacuda" – 5:33
"Nervous Breakdown" (McBurnie) – 3:23
"Silver Screen" (McBurnie) – 4:32
"Tentacles" (McBurnie) – 3:32
"Kabala" – 4:57
"Love-Hate-Sun-Rain-You" (Zmirou) – 4:51
"Time for a Change" – 9:06
"Time to Fly"
"Big Bands of Ancient Temples"
"Serenade"
"Back to Nature"

Personnel

Performers 
Patrick Moraz – keyboards, vocals, vibraphone, effects
François Zmirou – vocals ("Love-Hate-Sun-Rain-You")
John McBurnie – vocals ("Out in the Sun", "Rana Batacuda", "Nervous Breakdown", "Silver Screen", "Tentacles", "Kabala" and "Back to Nature")
Vivienne McAuliffe – vocals
Ray Gomez – guitars, mandolin
Wornell Jones – bass guitar
Jean Ristori – bass guitar ("Kabala")
Isla Eckinger – acoustic bass ("Back to Nature")
Testa Chacal – congas, pandeiro, percussion ("Kabala")
The Percussionists of Rio de Janeiro – percussion ("Rana Batacuda")
Phillipe Staehli – timpani ("Time for a Change")
Andy Newmark – drums

Production 
Patrick Moraz – producer
Jean Ristori – producer, engineer
Erroll Maibach – assistant engineer
Ray Staff – mastering
Camille Broye – tape op

References 

1977 albums
Charisma Records albums
Patrick Moraz albums